Ganeor is a small Village/hamlet in Khunti Block in Khunti District of Jharkhand State, India. It comes under Ganeor Panchayath. It is located south of District headquarters Khunti and 35 km from State capital Ranchi.

Physiography
Ganeor is surrounded by Murhu Block towards South, Karra Block towards west, Bandgaon Block towards South, Torpa Block towards west. 
Khunti, Ranchi, Barughutu are Chakradharpur are the nearby cities to Ganeor.

Geography
Ganeor is geographically rich as on the north east lies a pair small Mountains known as "Bhalki pahad". 
North is surrounded by large Precambrian rocks which are said to be abode of Tigers known as "Bagh Lata".

Demographics 
Hindi is the local language in Ganeor.

Transport

Rail
There is no railway station near to Ganeor in less than 10 km. However Hatia railway station is major railway station 29 km near to Ganeor.

Roadways
Roads connecting major cities are providing movement for passenger and freight traffic. There is a district road connecting Torpa, Murhu, Govindpur, Khunti and Ranchi.

Healthcare
To cater the medical needs of patients, especially those with tuberculosis, people go to:
 Govt. Hospital Khunti
 Ramkrishna Sanatorium

Schools and colleges
For making children literate the state government provides:

 Govt. Basic School 
 Jaipal Singh High School
 Birsa College, Khunti
 St. Joseph Intermediate College, Torpa

Place for worship
There is a catholic church in the village, where villagers and nearby people come to offer mass.

References

Cities and towns in Khunti district